Bruckless is a tiny village in southwest Donegal, Ireland, with a population of around 69. It lies on the N56 national secondary road which links it to Donegal Town 20 km east and to Killybegs 7 km west. The village overlooks McSwyne's Bay, an inlet in Donegal Bay. Bruckless is part of the Roman Catholic parish of Killaghtee and the diocese of Raphoe. In the Church of Ireland, it is covered by the parish of Inver and the diocese of Diocese of Derry and Raphoe.

The parish church, the Church of Saints Joseph and Conal, is noted for its round tower and there are numerous archaeological artifacts in the area, including early Christian cross slabs. The village pub is called Mary Murrins, and the village also has a small shop. The village has close ties with neighbouring Dunkineely.

Bruckless railway station opened on 18 October 1893 on the Donegal Railway Company line from Donegal to Killybegs. It closed on 1 January 1960.

See also
List of towns and villages in Ireland

References

Towns and villages in County Donegal